The Arda River is a river in Portugal. It flows into the Douro River.

Rivers of Portugal
Tributaries of the Douro River